The K'o-sa is an ancient Uyghur tribe mentioned by ancient Chinese texts. D.M. Dunlop believed that they were connected with the Khazars, and thus postulated a Uyghur, rather than Hunnish origin for that people. The K'o-sa, who belonged to a Tujue tribe, were first mentioned under Du Huan's accounts on Tongdian as possessing the areas north of Syria and the Byzantine Empire. They existed under a variant name in Suishu and formed part of the Tiele confederation whose presence was around or close to the Caspian Sea.

See also
Tele
Uyghur
Khazars

References
Douglas M. Dunlop, The History of the Jewish Khazars, Princeton, N.J.: Princeton University Press, 1954.

Ko-sa
Turkic peoples of Asia